The 17201 / 17202 Golconda Express is an Prestigious intercity express train running between Secunderabad and Guntur. It is provided with stoppage at Pedakakani railway station with effect from 1 May 2011.

Etymology 
This train is named after the historic Golconda Fort in Hyderabad. It is one of the important landmark in Hyderabad built by the Qutb Shahi dynasty of Hyderabad.

Achievements 
Achievement 1: In 1973, this service was the fastest steam passenger train in India.

Route & Halts
, 

Traction
It is hauled by a Lallaguda-based WAP-7 (HOG) equipped locomotive on its entire journey.

Rake sharing
The train shares its rake with 17233/17234 Bhagyanagar Express.

Accidents and incidents 
On the morning of 2 July 2003, part of  the Secunderabad-bound Golconda Express fell from a bridge near Warangal, killing at least 21 people. In 1999, the train derailed near Ghanpur (Station) in Warangal district of Telangana.

References 

Transport in Secunderabad
Transport in Guntur
Railway services introduced in 1969
Named passenger trains of India
Express trains in India